Adam Amin (born December 19, 1986) is an American sportscaster. Amin joined Fox Sports in June 2020 as a play-by-play announcer for MLB and NFL games after previously working for ESPN from 2011-2020. He is also the television play-by-play announcer for the Chicago Bulls of the NBA.

Early life
Amin's father, Mohammed, emigrated to the United States from Karachi, Pakistan in 1978. He settled in Chicago and worked in a factory. His wife, Zubeda, and three sons, Ismail, Abdullah, and Mustafa, remained in Pakistan, until Mohammed made enough money to send for them in 1985. Adam was born the next year in Chicago. Amin graduated from Addison Trail High School in suburban Addison, Illinois in 2005. He graduated from Valparaiso University in 2009.

Career
While at Valparaiso University, Amin began broadcasting on WVUR-FM, the student-run college radio station, and called Minor League Baseball games for the Gary SouthShore RailCats and Joliet JackHammers.

Between 2007 and 2011, Amin worked as a sportscaster for the Turner Sports & Entertainment Digital Network, Fox Sports Wisconsin, the Horizon League Network, the Illinois High School Association, and served as Sports Director of KUOO in Spirit Lake, Iowa. In 2010 and 2011, he called games for the Somerset Patriots of the Atlantic League of Professional Baseball on WCTC.

ESPN hired Amin in 2011 to call college football and college basketball. He has also called professional football, basketball, and baseball as well as collegiate softball, tennis, volleyball, baseball and amateur wrestling.

In 2012, Amin expanded his football broadcasts by signing a contract with Sports USA Radio Network to call NFL and college games. He remained with them until he signed his new ESPN contract, when he was named the new lead announcer for the NFL on ESPN Radio. 

He signed a new contract with ESPN in 2017. In 2018, he called the Final Four of the 2018 NCAA Division I women's basketball tournament, the Nathan's Hot Dog Eating Contest, preseason games for the Chicago Bears of the National Football League, and began fill-in work for the Chicago Bulls.

Amin left ESPN for Fox Sports in May 2020. He made his Fox debut on July 25, calling the Brewers-Cubs game, alongside Eric Karros.

It was announced on June 1, 2020, that Amin would become the TV play-by-play broadcaster for the Bulls on NBC Sports Chicago, starting with the 2020–2021 season.

On August 31, 2020, Fox announced that Amin would be a play-by-play broadcaster for the 2020 NFL season, partnering with former Pro Bowler and Super Bowl champion Mark Schlereth and Lindsay Czarniak. This would be the first time that Amin would call regular season NFL games on TV. Amin's first game was at Mercedes-Benz Stadium when the Seattle Seahawks defeated the Atlanta Falcons 38-25. Amin made his Fox MLB playoff debut in October 2020, calling the National League Division Series between the Atlanta Braves and Miami Marlins, alongside A.J. Pierzynski and Adam Wainwright. The National Sports Media Association named Amin the Illinois Sportscaster of the Year for 2021.

References

External links

1986 births
American people of Pakistani descent
American radio sports announcers
American sports radio personalities
American television sports announcers
Chicago Bears announcers
College baseball announcers in the United States
College basketball announcers in the United States
College football announcers
Living people
Major League Baseball broadcasters
Minor League Baseball broadcasters
National Basketball Association broadcasters
National Football League announcers
People from Addison, Illinois
People from Chicago
Softball announcers
Sportswriters from Illinois
Tennis commentators
Valparaiso University alumni
Volleyball commentators
Women's college basketball announcers in the United States